The 2016–17 season is Al-Talaba Sport Club's 42nd consecutive season in the Iraqi Premier League, the top-flight of Iraqi football. Having finished in 3rd place in the final stage of the previous season, Al-Talaba is competing in the Iraqi Premier League and the Iraq FA Cup.

Season summary

Pre-season
The first step that was taken by the administrative board was to renew Ayoub Odisho's contract for another season, announcing it on their Facebook page on 10 June 2016 with a worth of 300m IQD. With Kareem Salman being taken to the Iraq national under-23 team as an assistant manager, Al-Talaba were left to sign a new assistant, contacting Mudhaffar Jabbar and Saadi Toma, who refused the offer, and Shaker Mahmoud who approved and was signed on 15 July.

Al-Talaba announced on 13 June their first six signings. They signed eight other players including two big names, Ameer Sabah and Mustafa Karim, on 20 June, returning to their home club. The board also renewed the contracts of 12 players including last season's captain, Younis Mahmoud, second captain Mahdi Karim, and the team's playmaker, Samer Saeed. Al-Talaba released Mustafa Karim and Ameer Sabah in August, after two months of signing them due to a financial dispute with the board along with signing the three allowed foreign players who were all from Africa.

September
Al-Talaba started their 2016–17 Iraqi Premier League campaign on 15 September 2016 with a 1–1 draw against their rivals Al-Shorta, equalizing the score just before the end of the first half with a header from the team's captain, Samer Saeed, from a corner after the opponent took advantage of a miscommunication between Ali Abdul-Hassan and Ehab Kadhim and scored the first goal. In the second round, Al-Talaba managed to get a 1–0 win against the title holders Al-Zawra'a with Samer Saeed's goal from Saad Jassim's cross. Against the newly promoted club Al-Hussein, Al-Talaba claimed their second win with a goal from Karrar Ali Barri while playing with ten men due to the injury of Muthana Khalid and having no substitutes left.

October
After their match against Al-Quwa Al-Jawiya was postponed, Al-Talaba faced the newly promoted side Al-Bahri away. The match ended in a 2–2 draw with the goals of Mustafa Al-Ameen, which went in from a deflection in the second minute of the match, and Ehab Kadhim from a penalty in the second half before Al-Bahri equalized in the last minutes with a penalty as well. Al-Talaba returned to their winning ways with a comfortable 3–0 against Karbalaa at home. Two goals were scored by Yassir Abdul-Mohsen and the last one was scored from a penalty by Mahdi Karim.

November
Al-Talaba went into their sixth game of the season with no losses to face Al-Naft away. After only 12 seconds, Al-Naft scored and in the 18th minute, they extended the lead, ending the first half at 2–0. In the second half, Samer Saeed pulled one back before the team captain Mahdi Karim equalized from a penalty in the extra time. On 6 November, the club announced its bankruptcy and decided to stop all of its activities and withdraw from the league. After two days, they took back their decision after the Minister of Higher Education and Scientific Research Abdul-Razzaq Al-Essa promised the club to pay for all of its dues after an interference from the Minister of Youth and Sport Abdul-Hussein Aptan to solve the situation. In the 8th round, Al-Talaba faced Erbil at home. They dominated the match but Erbil's defense denied them many goals which resulted in a 0–0 draw.

Players

Squad information
The squad for the season consisted of the players listed in the tables below:

|}

Players In

Players Out

Technical staff

Statistics

Overall statistics

Last updated: 16 December 2016

Top scorers

Last updated: 11 December 2016

Clean sheets

Last updated: 16 December 2016

Friendlies

Competitions

Overview
{| class="wikitable" style="text-align: center"
|-
!rowspan=2|Competition
!colspan=8|Record
|-
!
!
!
!
!
!
!
!
|-
| Iraqi Premier League

|-
| Iraq FA Cup

|-
! Total

Iraqi Premier League

League table

Results summary

Results by matchday

Matches

References

Sport in Baghdad
Al Talaba seasons
Al-Talaba SC
Al Talaba